Minang may refer to:

Sumatra
 Minangkabau people, an ethnic group in Sumatra 
 Padang cuisine or Minang food, the cuisine of the Minangkabau people
 Minang language, the language spoken by the Minangkabau people

Australia
 Mineng, also spelled Minang, an indigenous people of Australia
 Mineng language, or Minang, a dialect of the Nyungar subgroup

See also
Minangkabau (disambiguation)